Alan Blumenfeld (born September 4, 1952) is an American character actor, best known for his role in NBC's TV series Heroes as Maury Parkman, the telepath father of Matt Parkman played by Greg Grunberg, and as Bob Buss in the telefilm 2gether. He has played Greg Grunberg's father in both Felicity and Heroes.

Life and career
Blumenfeld has been acting since the age of 7 in his first grade, and has appeared in prime time television shows such as Grey's Anatomy, JAG, Gilmore Girls, CSI: Crime Scene Investigation, Without a Trace, and Judging Amy. He has also appeared in movies, including The Ring, In Her Shoes, and Friday the 13th Part VI: Jason Lives. He was also the voice of Glottis and Boyd Cooper on the cult video-games Grim Fandango and Psychonauts respectively.

Blumenfeld currently lives in Los Angeles and is still active in theater, film and television acting. He also  teaches acting at Pomona College in Claremont, CA.

Filmography

Film

Television

Television guest appearances

Video games
 Grim Fandango (1998) as Glottis
 Jak and Daxter: The Precursor Legacy (2001) as Willard
 Jak II (2003) as Brutter / Mog / Grim
 Psychonauts (2005) as Boyd Cooper / Second Peasant
 Daxter (2006) as Brutter
 SpyHunter: Nowhere to Run (2006) as IES Soldiers / Kryo / Nostra Scientist
 The Darkness II (2012) as Additional Voices
 Fallout 4 (2015) as Skinny Malone / Clarence Codman / Evan Watson

References

External links

Where Are They Now? Alan Blumenfeld - "Larry" at FridayThe13thFilms.com

American male film actors
American male television actors
Living people
1952 births
Pomona College faculty
20th-century American male actors
21st-century American male actors
People from Rockville Centre, New York
Male actors from New York (state)